Martina Voss-Tecklenburg (born Martina Voss; 22 December 1967) is a German football manager and former player who coaches the German national team. She previously coached FCR 2001 Duisburg and FF USV Jena. As a player, she played as a  midfielder or forward, featuring for KBC Duisburg, TSV Siegen and FCR 2001 Duisburg. She made 125 appearances for the Germany national team.

International career
Martina played three FIFA Women's World Cup (1991, 1995, 1999), one Olympiad (1996) and five UEFA Women's Championship (1989, 1991, 1993, 1995, 1997).

Coaching career
After the end of her active career as a player, Voss-Tecklenburg worked as a team manager for the Oberliga club SV Straelen. Full-time as a PE teacher association, she takes care of female selection teams in the Lower Rhine. She is also chief editor of the women's football magazine "FF".

From 12 February 2008 to 17 February 2011 she was the head coach of FCR 2001 Duisburg.  With Duisburg, Voss-Tecklenburg won the UEFA Women's Cup in 2009 and two national cups in 2009 and 2010. Her contract was ended on 17 February 2011. In June 2011 she signed a one-year contract at Bundesliga side FF USV Jena, but she left the team next January as she was appointed the Swiss national team's new coach.

Personal life 
She was in a lesbian relationship with German football player Inka Grings until 2000. She is married to German entrepreneur Hermann Tecklenburg and has one daughter and a grandchild.

International goals

Personal life
On 1 October 2009, she married developer Hermann Tecklenburg. She has a daughter from a previous relationship.

Honours

Player
KBC Duisburg
 Bundesliga: 1985
 DFB-Pokal: 1983

TSV Siegen
 Bundesliga: 1990, 1991, 1992, 1994
 DFB-Pokal: 1989, 1993

FCR 2001 Duisburg
 Bundesliga: 2000
 DFB-Pokal: 1998

Germany
 FIFA Women's World Cup: runner-up 1995
 UEFA Women's Championship: 1989, 1991, 1995, 1997

Individual
 Footballer of the Year in Germany: 1996, 2000

Manager
FCR 2001 Duisburg
 UEFA Women's Champions League: 2009
 DFB-Pokal: 2009, 2010
Germany

 UEFA Women's Championship runner-up: 2022

References

External links

1967 births
Living people
German women's footballers
Germany women's international footballers
FCR 2001 Duisburg players
Footballers at the 1996 Summer Olympics
Footballers from Duisburg
FIFA Century Club
1991 FIFA Women's World Cup players
1995 FIFA Women's World Cup players
1999 FIFA Women's World Cup players
German women's football managers
2015 FIFA Women's World Cup managers
Olympic footballers of Germany
UEFA Women's Championship-winning players
Women's association football midfielders
Women's association football forwards
Switzerland women's national football team managers
Germany women's national football team managers
2019 FIFA Women's World Cup managers
Female association football managers
UEFA Women's Euro 2022 managers
German expatriate football managers
German expatriate sportspeople in Switzerland
Expatriate football managers in Switzerland